The meridian 69° east of Greenwich is a line of longitude that extends from the North Pole across the Arctic Ocean, Asia, the Indian Ocean, the Southern Ocean, and Antarctica to the South Pole.

The 69th meridian east forms a great circle with the 111th meridian west.

From Pole to Pole
Starting at the North Pole and heading south to the South Pole, the 69th meridian east passes through:

{| class="wikitable plainrowheaders"
! scope="col" width="115" | Co-ordinates
! scope="col" | Country, territory or sea
! scope="col" | Notes
|-
| style="background:#b0e0e6;" | 
! scope="row" style="background:#b0e0e6;" | Arctic Ocean
| style="background:#b0e0e6;" |
|-
| style="background:#b0e0e6;" | 
! scope="row" style="background:#b0e0e6;" | Barents Sea
| style="background:#b0e0e6;" |
|-valign="top"
| 
! scope="row" | 
| Severny Island, Novaya Zemlya, Arkhangelsk Oblast - for about 4 km at the easternmost tip of the island
|-
| style="background:#b0e0e6;" | 
! scope="row" style="background:#b0e0e6;" | Kara Sea
| style="background:#b0e0e6;" |
|-
| 
! scope="row" | 
| Yamal Peninsula, Yamalo-Nenets Autonomous Okrug
|-
| style="background:#b0e0e6;" | 
! scope="row" style="background:#b0e0e6;" | Kara Sea
| style="background:#b0e0e6;" | Baydaratskaya Bay
|-
| 
! scope="row" | 
|Yamalo-Nenetsia Khantia-Mansia (passing through Khanty-Mansiysk), Tyumen Oblast
|-
| 
! scope="row" | 
| North Kazakhstan Region For about 10 km
|-
| 
! scope="row" | 
| Tyumen Oblast For about 6 km
|-
| 
! scope="row" | 
| North Kazakhstan Region, Akmola Region, Karaganda Region, Turkistan Region
|-
| 
! scope="row" | 
| Tashkent Region, Sirdaryo Region
|-
| 
! scope="row" | 
| Sughd Region For about 9 km
|-
| 
! scope="row" | 
| Sirdaryo Region For about 7 km
|-
| 
! scope="row" | 
| Sughd Region, DCGJ Region, Khatlon Region
|-
| 
! scope="row" | 
| Kunduz Province, Baghlan Province, Parwan Province, Kabul Province (passing just west of Kabul), Logar Province, Paktia Province, Paktika Province
|-valign="top"
| 
! scope="row" | 
| Balochistan Sindh
|-
| 
! scope="row" | 
| Gujarat
|-
| style="background:#b0e0e6;" | 
! scope="row" style="background:#b0e0e6;" | Indian Ocean
| style="background:#b0e0e6;" | Gulf of Kutch
|-
| 
! scope="row" | 
| Gujarat
|-
| style="background:#b0e0e6;" | 
! scope="row" style="background:#b0e0e6;" | Indian Ocean
| style="background:#b0e0e6;" |
|-valign="top"
| 
! scope="row" | 
| Island of Kerguelen
|-
| style="background:#b0e0e6;" | 
! scope="row" style="background:#b0e0e6;" | Indian Ocean
| style="background:#b0e0e6;" |
|-
| style="background:#b0e0e6;" | 
! scope="row" style="background:#b0e0e6;" | Southern Ocean
| style="background:#b0e0e6;" |
|-
| 
! scope="row" | Antarctica
| Australian Antarctic Territory, claimed by 
|-
|}

See also
68th meridian east
70th meridian east

e069 meridian east